Georges Pianta (2 March 1912, in Thonon-les-Bains – 23 October 1997 in Thonon-les-Bains) was a French politician. He represented the National Centre of Independents and Peasants (CNIP) (from 1958 to 1962), the Independent Republicans from 1962 to 1978 and the Union for French Democracy (UDF) from 1978 to 1981 in the National Assembly. He was the mayor of Thonon-les-Bains from 1944 to 1980.

References

1912 births
1997 deaths
People from Thonon-les-Bains
Mayors of places in Auvergne-Rhône-Alpes
National Centre of Independents and Peasants politicians
Independent Republicans politicians
Union for French Democracy politicians
Deputies of the 3rd National Assembly of the French Fourth Republic
Deputies of the 1st National Assembly of the French Fifth Republic
Deputies of the 2nd National Assembly of the French Fifth Republic
Deputies of the 3rd National Assembly of the French Fifth Republic
Deputies of the 4th National Assembly of the French Fifth Republic
Deputies of the 5th National Assembly of the French Fifth Republic
Deputies of the 6th National Assembly of the French Fifth Republic